Marc Van De Weghe (born 9 May 1964) is a Belgian freestyle swimmer. He competed in two events at the 1984 Summer Olympics.

References

External links
 

1964 births
Living people
Belgian male freestyle swimmers
Olympic swimmers of Belgium
Swimmers at the 1984 Summer Olympics
Place of birth missing (living people)